Pamela Lincoln (born Pamela Gill; June 19, 1937 – November 21, 2019) was an American actress of television and film. Her best-known movie role is the William Castle film The Tingler, where her screams save the life of Vincent Price, who is being attacked by the bizarre creature. Pamela had contract roles on two daytime soap operas, Love of Life as the tragic Felicia Fleming Lamont, 1974 to 1977, who was involved with the dashing Eduardo Aleata (played by John Aniston) while married to the older Charles Lamont, and The Doctors as the scheming Doreen Aldrich, from 1977 to 1979, who notoriously kidnapped heroine Carolee Aldrich (her former sister-in-law) when she falsely believed that she was dying of leukemia and decided that she wanted Carolee's husband, Steve. In 1984, Pamela appeared on One Life to Live as Suzanne Allardyce, the widow of the president of a fictional South American country.

Biography

She was born in Los Angeles, California in June 1937 to actress Verna Hillie and writer Frank Gill Jr. She was married to actor Darryl Hickman in 1959, and had two children with him; they subsequently divorced in 1982. Lincoln died in Branford, Connecticut, in November 2019 at the age of 82.

Filmography

References

External links 

 

1937 births
2019 deaths
Actresses from Los Angeles
American film actresses
American television actresses
21st-century American women